Healy may refer to:

Healy (surname)
 USCGC Healy (WAGB-20), a United States Coast Guard icebreaker

Places
 Healy (crater), a lunar impact crater on the far side of the Moon
 Healy (Metra station), a commuter rail station in Chicago
 Healy (volcano), a submarine volcano near New Zealand's Kermadec Islands
 Healy, Alaska, United States
 Healy, Kansas, United States
 Healy Hall, Georgetown University, Washington, DC, United States
 Healy, Queensland, Australia, a suburb of Mount Isa

See also
 Healey (disambiguation)
 Hely, a given name and surname